The 2011 AFC Annual Awards was the top football players and coaches of the year in Asia. 

Among six candidates, Server Djeparov win the Asian Footballer of the Year award for the second time.

Aya Miyama, Japan women's football team player which won 2011 FIFA Women's World Cup was awarded Asian Women Footballer of the Year.

Hideki Ishige and Caitlin Foord becomes the Youth Player of the Year. Al-Sadd which won 2011 AFC Champions League was named as the Club of the Year. Both Japan's men and women's team was named as National Team of the Year.

Norio Sasaki was awarded as the Coach of the Year. Mohammad Keshavarz, MVP of the 2011 AFC Futsal Club Championship was awarded as Futsal Player of the Year. Nagoya Oceans, winner of the 2011 AFC Futsal Club Championship was named as Futsal Club of the Year. Fair Play Award was given to the South Korea national football team.

Winners

Men 
Only two players of shortlist competed for the award under a rule, which omitted nominees who didn't attend the ceremony.

Women

Coach

Young Player

Futsal Player

References

External links 
 Official page

Asian Football Confederation trophies and awards
AFC Annual Award, 2011